

	

Pureba is a locality in the Australian state of South Australia located on the west coast of Eyre Peninsula and on land to the immediate north of the peninsula about  north-west of the state capital of Adelaide and about  north-east and  north respectively of the municipal seats of Ceduna and Streaky Bay.

Pureba's boundaries were created in January 1999 with its name ultimately derived from Pureba Hill, a hill located within its boundaries.
Pureba’s boundaries were altered on 26 April 2013 “to ensure the whole of the Pureba Conservation Park is within the locality of the same name.”

The land use within Pureba is mainly concerned with the Pureba Conservation Park, although “approved mineral exploration and mining” is allowed under the National Parks and Wildlife Act 1972.

Pureba is located within the federal division of Grey, the state electoral district of Giles, the local government areas of the District Council of Ceduna and the District Council of Streaky Bay, and the state’s Pastoral Unincorporated Area.

Surrounding localities
Pureba is surrounded by the following localities gazetted under the South Australian Geographical Names Act 1991:
 North: Yumbarra, Yellabinna
 Northeast: Kondoolka
 East:  Kondoolka, Pinjarra Station, Yondoolka  and Gawler Ranges
 Southeast: Gawler Ranges
 South: Maltee, Mudamuckla, Nunjikompita, Wallala, Koolgera, and Yantanabie
 Southwest: Wandana
 West: Wandana
 Northwest: Yumbarra

References
Notes

Citations

Towns in South Australia
Eyre Peninsula
Places in the unincorporated areas of South Australia